Mahmoud Assad is a former Iraqi football forward who played for Iraq between 1966 and 1967. He played in the 1966 Arab Nations Cup and scored 1 goal.

Career statistics

International goals
Scores and results list Iraq's goal tally first.

References

Iraqi footballers
Iraq international footballers
Living people
Association football forwards
Year of birth missing (living people)